Fatima Hernadi (born 1951 in Azemmour) is a Moroccan actress known for Raouia.

Biography 
Fatima Hernadi was born in Azemmour. She moved to Casablanca to complete her study at chawki High School, where she joined the theater band Mansour, with which she won the award for Best Actress at the National Amateur Theatre Festival in the play Failers. Until 1978, she worked in cinema, with director Mohamed El Abazi, in his film, "Treasures of Atlas.after that, she participated in a film called Dry Eyes starring Narjiss Nejjar in 2004, a role that launched her into the Moroccan cinema.

In 2014, she won the Best Actress award at the National Film Festival for her film Saga, The Story of Men Who Never Come Back. Afterward, she was selected as a member of the jury of the 16th edition of the Marrakech International Film Festival.

Filmography

Films

Series

References

External links 

 
Profile at AlloCiné

1951 births
21st-century Moroccan actresses
Living people
Moroccan film actresses
Moroccan television actresses